The County Borough of Leeds, and its predecessor, the Municipal Borough of Leeds, was a local government district in the West Riding of Yorkshire, England, from 1835 to 1974. Its origin was the ancient borough of Leeds, which was reformed by the Municipal Corporations Act 1835. In 1889, when West Riding County Council was formed, Leeds became a county borough outside the administrative county of the West Riding; and in 1893 the borough gained city status. In 1971 Leeds was the fifth largest county borough by population in England. The county borough was abolished in 1974 and replaced with the larger City of Leeds, a metropolitan district of West Yorkshire.

Origins

Manorial borough 1207–1626
The Borough of Leeds was created in 1207, when Maurice Paynel, Lord of the Manor, granted a charter to the inhabitants of the town of Leeds. They were created "burgesses", and were given the right to hold half an acre of land, trade as they liked, and transport their goods by land or water, subject to tolls and restrictions paid to the manor. The only officer of the borough was a praetor, appointed annually at the Feast of Pentecost by the Lord of the Borough. The praetor had the duty of administering justice and collecting fines and other revenues. The borough formed only a small area adjacent to a crossing of the River Aire, between the old settlement centred on Leeds Parish Church to the east and the manor house and mills to the west. The borough consisted of a single street with approximately thirty burgage plots.  By the seventeenth century the title of praetor had been abandoned in favour of the more customary "bailiff", but otherwise the government of the town remained in the form introduced in the thirteenth century. An enquiry into the administration of local charities in 1620 disclosed that many of the funds were diverted by the bailiff for his private use. This, and other irregularities, led the inhabitants of Leeds to petition Charles I for a charter of incorporation.

Incorporated borough (1626–1836)

Incorporation
A charter of incorporation was granted on 13 July 1626, incorporating the entire parish of Leeds St Peter as the "Borough of Leedes in the County of York". The parish and borough consisted of eleven chapelries (Armley, Beeston, Bramley, Chapel Allerton, Farnley, Headingley cum Burley, Holbeck, Hunslet, Leeds, Potternewton and Wortley) and parts of two more (Seacroft and Temple Newsam).

The governing corporation of the borough was styled "The Alderman and Burgesses of the Borough of Leedes in the County of York", and consisted of one Alderman, nine principal burgesses and twenty assistants. The charter named the members of the first corporation, with Sir John Savile becoming the first alderman.

Charter of Charles II
In January 1643, during the English Civil War, Leeds fell to parliamentary forces. Royalist members of the corporation were replaced with those loyal to the Commonwealth. With the restoration of the monarchy in 1660, moves were made to reform the borough's government. The leading merchants of the town submitted a petition to Charles II requesting a new charter as they felt the constitution and operation of the governing body was inadequate to the needs of the town.

A second charter was duly granted on 2 November 1661, with the earlier charter withdrawn. The new corporation thus created consisted of a mayor, twelve aldermen, twenty four assistants,  a recorder and a town clerk and was entitled the "Mayor, Aldermen and Burgesses of the Borough of Leedes in the County of York".  The charter named the first mayor as Thomas Danby. The new corporation was given extensive powers to enforce and make laws to regulate trade and ensure the good governance of the town. From 1684 to 1689 the town was governed under a charter of James II which gave the crown power over all appointments to the town council. With the accession of William III and Mary II the 1661 charter was restored to the townspeople, and remained the governing charter until 1836.

Municipal borough (1836–1889)

In 1833 the Whig Government of Lord Grey began enquiries into the government of the various boroughs in England and Wales, with a view to reforming their constitutions and methods of election. Following the recommendations of a Royal Commission, legislation was enacted as the Municipal Corporations Act 1835.

Leeds was among the 178 boroughs reformed by the act, becoming the "Municipal Borough of Leeds". The reformed borough was initially unchanged in area, and was divided into 12 wards, with a town council of 16 aldermen and 48 councillors, headed by a mayor. Each ward was represented by either three or six directly elected councillors. One third of the councillors retired annually. Aldermen were additional members of the council, there being one alderman for every three councillors: they had a six-year term of office, with half of the aldermanic bench elected by the council itself every three years.

It was originally envisaged that the first elections would be held on 1 November 1835, with the reformed town councils holding their first meetings on 9 November following. However, the process of dividing the boroughs into wards and preparing the burgess roll or electoral register was a lengthy one, and an Order in Council was made delaying the first elections to 26 December, with the new boroughs coming into formal existence on 1 January 1836.

An early focus of the new authority was on policing and crime, with construction of a new borough prison begun in 1842. The Leeds Improvement Act of 1842 gave the council further powers over markets, streets, street lighting, sewerage, building regulations, public cleansing and smoke regulation in the rapidly growing industrial city.

In 1881 the wards were redrawn, so that the borough comprised sixteen wards. The size of the town council remained the same, however, with each new ward returning one alderman and three councillors.

County borough 1889–1974
The Local Government Act 1888 created elected county councils to administer services throughout England and Wales. Where a municipal borough had a population of more than 50,000 at the 1881 Census it was created a county borough, with the powers and duties of both a borough and county council.

As Leeds had an 1881 population of 309,119 it duly became a county borough on 1 April 1889. The borough, while independent of the West Riding County Council for local government, remained part of the county for purposes such as the administration of justice and lieutenancy.

The change of status in 1889 made no change to the boundaries of the borough or the size of the council.

City status and lord mayoralty
Until 1889 the right to the title of "city" in the United Kingdom was linked to the presence of an Anglican cathedral. In that year Birmingham, Dundee and Belfast were granted letters patent raising them to cities by virtue of their population, economic importance and history of good municipal government.

In 1892 another borough in the West Riding, Sheffield, announced that it was seeking the grant of city status to celebrate the Golden Jubilee of the town's incorporation, which was to occur in 1893. When the members of Leeds Town Council became aware of the application by Sheffield, which was both smaller in population and of more recent creation than Leeds, they immediately began the process of applying for the dignity themselves. A petition was approved on 4 January 1893, which set out the reasons it was felt that Leeds deserved to become a city: these were the antiquity of the town, its many charters, its large area, its population that was "approaching 400,000", the fact that it was the largest municipality not to be a city, and its commercial importance for the woollen industry.

A delegation from Leeds, including two Members of Parliament (MPs), met with the Home Secretary, H H Asquith on 27 January to press the borough's case. Along with the claims of the borough as set out in the original petition, the delegation made two more points: Leeds was the only university town not a city, and Leeds and Sheffield were the only boroughs returning five MPs to the House of Commons without the status (of a city).

The Home Secretary forwarded the petitions of both boroughs to The Queen on 3 February, recommending that the honour be granted in both cases as they were the "only towns in the United Kingdom with a population exceeding 300,000 to which the title of City, enjoyed by many smaller of less important places, has not been granted; and that both appear to be well fitted by their loyalty, public spirit, and industrial progress, for this mark of your Majesty's favour."

On 7 February, Sir Godfrey Lushington, permanent secretary to the Home Office, wrote to the mayors of both towns signifying that the applications had been approved. The award was made by letters patent on 13 February, and was announced in the London Gazette on 21 February:
The Queen has been pleased, by Letters Patent under the Great Seal of the United Kingdom, bearing date the 13th February 1893, to
ordain and declare that the Borough of Leeds shall be a City, and shall be called and styled "The City of Leeds".

Four years later the Diamond Jubilee of the accession of Queen Victoria occurred. As part of the celebrations it was announced on 21 June that the mayor of Leeds "shall in future bear the title of Lord Mayor". The award which empowered the Lord Mayor to enjoy and use all the rights, privileges, pre-eminencies and advantages to "such degree duly and of right belonging" was made by Letters Patent dated 12 July, and was published in the London Gazette on the following day:
The Queen has been pleased, by Letters Patent under the Great Seal of the United Kingdom of Great Britain and Ireland, bearing date the 12th July, 1897 to ordain that the Chief Magistrate, now, and for the time being, of the City of Leeds, shall be styled Lord Mayor of Leeds.

Parishes to 1912

Townships and chapelries which were separately rated for poor law purposes were formed into civil parishes in 1866. The borough of Leeds contained eleven parishes and part of two others, and no changes were made to their boundaries until 1894. The Local Government Act 1894 provided that no parish could lie in more than one local government area, with parishes being divided or amalgamated as required.

In Leeds this was effected by constituting the part of Temple Newsam parish within the city a separate parish of Osmondthorpe, and merging the portion of Seacroft that lay within the municipal boundaries with the existing parish of Potternewton. The number of parishes into which the city was divided was reduced to five in 1904 by the following mergers:

Armley and Bramley formed from Armley, Bramley and Wortley
Holbeck (unchanged)
Hunslet (unchanged)
Leeds formed from Beeston, Chapel Allerton, Farnley, Headingley cum Burley, Leeds, Potternewton
Osmondthorpe (unchanged)

1912 extension
The city boundaries remained unchanged from 1836 until 1912. In 1904 the city council applied unsuccessfully to the Local Government Board for an enlargement of the county borough. A second application was made late in 1911. The corporation sought to add  to the north and east of the city: the parishes of Roundhay and Seacroft (comprising Leeds Rural District), the parish of Shadwell (from Wetherby Rural District) and the Crossgates area of the parish of Barwick in Elmet (from Tadcaster Rural District). The proposed extension would increase the county borough's population by 7,603 to 452,171. An inquiry was held in January 1912, at which the strong opposition of the West Riding County Council and all the parish and rural district councils involved was made clear.

The extension took effect on 9 November 1912, with the added areas initially being added to the existing north ward and to the parish of Leeds.

1920 extension

In 1919 the city council sought another extension, this time to the south, by taking in the parish of Middleton from Hunslet Rural District. The boundary change took effect on 1 April 1920, and Middleton formed a 17th ward, electing 3 councillors and 1 alderman to the city council, which was increased in size accordingly. The parish of Middleton was abolished, with its area added to the existing parish of Hunslet. The extra territory was acquired by the county borough for a major scheme of council housing, the construction of which commenced almost immediately. On 1 April 1925 the five parishes in the county borough were united into a single parish of Leeds.

1928 extension
In 1927 Leeds Corporation promoted a bill to add further areas to the city, namely Gildersome Urban District, and parts of the rural districts of Hunslet, Tadcaster and Wharfedale (the parishes of  Adel cum Eccup, Alwoodley, Austhorpe – except for a detached part – and Templenewsham). The Leeds Corporation Act 1927, as passed, omitted Gildersome and most of Austhorpe from the area added to Leeds.

In 1930 the wards of the county borough were redrawn, necessitating a general election of the entire city council. Twenty-six wards were created, each returning 3 councillors and 1 alderman. The membership of the council was increased from 68 (51 councillors and 17 aldermen) to 104 (78 councillors and 26 aldermen).

Armley & New Wortley
Beeston
Blenheim
Bramley
Burmantofts
Central
Cross Gates & Templenewsham
East Hunslet
Far Headingley

Farnley
Harehills
Holbeck North
Holbeck South
Hunslet Carr & Middleton
Hyde Park
Kirkstall
Mill Hill and South
North

Osmondthorpe
Potternewton
Richmond Hill
Roundhay
West Hunslet
Westfield
Woodhouse
Wortley and Upper Armley

On 1 April 1937 the boundary of the county borough with the surrounding areas of the West Riding was adjusted under a county review order. The city exchanged areas with the following districts:

In 1950 the city council petitioned for an alteration in the number and boundaries of the municipal wards, and a consequent change in the number of aldermen and councillors. The petition was successful, with an Order in Council made on 28 July dividing the city into twenty-eight wards:

Allerton
Armley
Beeston
Blenheim
Bramley
Burmantofts
City

Cross Gates
East Hunslet
Far Headingley
Halton
Harehills
Holbeck
Hunslet Carr

Hyde Park
Kirkstall
Meanwood
Middleton
Moortown
Osmondthorpe
Potternewton

Richmond Hill
Roundhay
Stanningley
Wellington
Westfield
Woodhouse
Wortley

The redrawing of wards made a general election of the entire council necessary in May 1951. The new council had a membership of 112: 84 councillors and 28 aldermen.

1957 extension
Following the Second World War a Local Government Boundary Commission was appointed to review administrative structures throughout England and Wales. While the commission was in existence, local authorities were not permitted to make unilateral proposals for boundary changes. Although the commission recommended that Leeds should form the basis of a new unitary "one tier county" no action was taken. The commission itself was wound up in 1949, and the final enlargement of the county borough took place under the Leeds Corporation Act 1956, on 1 April 1957.  of Tadcaster Rural District were added to the city. The 1958 commission was disbanded in 1966, and the Redcliffe-Maud Commission appointed in its place. When their report was published in 1969, they recommended a system of large unitary authorities. The boundaries would have included a large rural area including part of the Yorkshire Dales and the town of Harrogate. The proposal was welcomed by Leeds City Council. Following a change of government, a white paper issued in 1971 rejected the unitary structure and instead proposed a metropolitan county of West Yorkshire, with Leeds forming a district in a two-tier system. During the passing of the subsequent legislation, which was enacted as the Local Government Act 1972, the boundaries of the Leeds Metropolitan District (or District 6b) were altered. Knaresborough and Harrogate were removed (becoming the basis of a non-metropolitan district in North Yorkshire) while Rothwell was added from the neighbouring Wakefield district.

Metropolitan borough
The 1972 legislation came into effect on 1 April 1974, with the county borough ceasing to exist at midnight on 31 March. The county borough's area was combined with that of the Municipal Borough of Morley, the Municipal Borough of Pudsey, Aireborough Urban District, Horsforth Urban District, Otley Urban District, Garforth Urban District, Rothwell Urban District and parts of Tadcaster Rural District, Wetherby Rural District and Wharfedale Rural District from the West Riding. The new Leeds district was one of five metropolitan districts in West Yorkshire. It was granted a borough and city status to become the City of Leeds.

References

County boroughs of England
History of Leeds
Districts of England abolished by the Local Government Act 1972